Natronoanaerobium salstagnum is a bacterium from the genus of Natronoanaerobium which has been isolated from the Lake Magadi in Kenya.

References

Natranaerobiales
Bacteria described in 1998